Mathilde De Cordoba (1882 – 1944) was an American painter and printmaker known for her child portraits. De Cordoba produced prints for the Works Progress Administration (WPA). Her work is in the collection of the Metropolitan Museum of Art, the National Gallery of Art, and the Print Collection of The New York Public Library.

References

External links
 images of De Cordoba's work at Mutual Art
 

1871 births
1942 deaths
Artists from New York City
Federal Art Project artists